Disney California Adventure is a Disney theme park in Anaheim, California, adjacent to Disneyland and part of the larger Disneyland Resort. It opened on February 8, 2001. Here is a list of the current attractions found therein, arranged by "land" and with brief descriptions. These are only attractions from the Disney California Adventure itself, not from Disneyland park or other parts of the Disneyland Resort, and that parades and character meets are not listed in this article. (The term "attractions" is used by Disney as a catch-all term for rides, shows, and exhibits.) Disney California Adventure currently has 34 attractions in the theme park.

Disney California Adventure began a major US$1.2 billion renovation in 2008 that ended in 2012. Virtually every aspect of the park had some type of work done to it.

Buena Vista Street

 Red Car Trolley

Hollywood Land

Originally Hollywood Pictures Backlot, until it was renamed to Hollywood Land, in 2012.

 Disney Junior Dance Party!
 Mickey's PhilharMagic at the Sunset Showcase Theater
 Monsters, Inc. Mike & Sulley to the Rescue!
 Red Car Trolley
Disney Animation:
Animation Academy
Sorcerer's Workshop
Turtle Talk with Crush

Avengers Campus

 Guardians of the Galaxy - Mission: BREAKOUT!
 Ancient Sanctum
 Web Slingers: A Spider-Man Adventure

Cars Land

 Luigi's Rollickin' Roadsters
 Mater's Junkyard Jamboree
 Radiator Springs Racers

Grizzly Peak

 Grizzly River Run
 Soarin' Around the World
 Redwood Creek Challenge Trail

Pacific Wharf

 The Bakery Tour

Pixar Pier

 Games of Pixar Pier
 Jessie's Critter Carousel
 Inside Out Emotional Whirlwind
 Incredicoaster
 Pixar Pal-A-Round
 Toy Story Midway Mania!

Paradise Gardens Park

 Golden Zephyr
 Goofy's Sky School
 Jumpin' Jellyfish
 The Little Mermaid: Ariel's Undersea Adventure
 Silly Symphony Swings
 World of Color

See also
 List of former Disneyland attractions
 List of former Disney California Adventure attractions
 List of Disneyland attractions

References

Disney California Adventure
Disney California Adventure attractions